Bye June is a 1998 South Korean film by Choi Ho. Four youngsters struggle with sex and drugs after their friend June's death.

This film marked the acting debuts of Kim Ha-neul and Yoo Ji-tae.

Plot
Chae-young and Do-gi are twenty-one years old. They both carry the burden of their best friend June's death in a fire two years ago. June was their common friend and they idolized him. Chae-young and Do-gi try to fill in the mutual emptiness with sex, drugs and alcohol. But the memory of June comes between them in every way. They both love each other, but for Chae-young, June can never be fully replaced and Do-gi cannot help but feel that he is second best.

Cast
 Yoo Ji-tae ... Do-gi
 Kim Ha-neul ... Chae-young
 Ha Rang ... June / Byeong-cheon
 Han Ji-yun
 Kim Ba-da
 DJ A-dang
 Jung Sang-in

External links 
 
 

1998 films
Films about drugs
1990s Korean-language films
South Korean drama films
1990s teen films
Films directed by Choi Ho
South Korean teen films